The 1927 All-Pro Team consists of American football players chosen by various selectors at the end as the best players at their positions for the All-Pro team of the National Football League (NFL) for the 1927 NFL season. Selectors for the 1927 season included the Green Bay Press-Gazette poll and the Chicago Tribune.

Selectors and key
For the 1927 season, there are five known selectors of All-Pro Teams. They are:

GB = A poll conducted by the Green Bay Press-Gazette identified first and second teams. The selections were based on polling of league managers and reporters.

CT = The Chicago Tribune selected by Wilfrid Smith

JR = Jack Reardon, a game official from New York

LA = LeRoy Andrews, head coach of the Cleveland Bulldogs

RS = Ralph Scott, head coach of the New York Yankees. Scott chose separate teams of "power" (RS-P) and "clever" (RS-C) players.

Players selected by three of the five selectors as first-team All-Pros are displayed in bold typeface. Players who have been inducted into the Pro Football Hall of Fame are designated with a "†" next to their names.

Selections by position

Ends

Tackles

Guards

Centers

Quarterbacks

Halfbacks

Fullbacks

References

All-Pro Teams
1927 National Football League season